Cooksonia trimeni is a butterfly in the family Lycaenidae first described by Hamilton Herbert Druce in 1905. It is found in the Democratic Republic of the Congo.

Subspecies
Cooksonia trimeni trimeni (Democratic Republic of the Congo)
Cooksonia trimeni terpsichore Talbot, 1935 (Democratic Republic of the Congo: Shaba)

Etymology
The genus name honours Harold Cookson (1876-1969), a farmer and amateur zoologist who lived in Muden, Natal, and later in the Vumba Mountains in what was then Rhodesia. The specific name honours Roland Trimen.

References

Butterflies described in 1905
Poritiinae
Endemic fauna of the Democratic Republic of the Congo
Butterflies of Africa
Taxa named by Hamilton Herbert Druce